Traumatic spondylopathy is a form of dorsopathy.

References

External links 

Musculoskeletal disorders